Côte d'Azur is the French name of the French Riviera, the Mediterranean coastline of the southeast corner of France.

Côte d'Azur may also refer to:

Côte d'Azur Observatory
Côte d'Azur Pullman Express, a French de luxe train which ran from 9 December 1929 until May 1939
Nice Côte d'Azur Airport
Cote d'Azur, Syria, a beach resort north of Latakia, Syria

Arts and entertainment
Wild Cats on the Beach, a 1959 Italian-French comedy film with the French-language title Côte d'Azur
Crustacés & Coquillages, a 2005 French movie released in North America as Côte d'Azur
Côte D'Azur (album), a 2011 album by The Rippingtons

See also 
Derby de la Côte d'Azur, an association football match contested between the primary clubs based on or near the French Riviera
Puducherry (union territory), nicknamed La Côte d'Azur de l'Est